Jason Beau Vale (born 21 June 1969 in Kensington, London), also known as The Juice Master, is an English author, motivational speaker, and lifestyle coach.

History
Vale was an addict of smoking, alcohol, and junk food and a chronic sufferer of psoriasis, eczema, and hay fever. Influenced by early juicing pioneer Norman Walker, Jason began juicing to improve his health. In his book Slim 4 Life, Vale outlines how he lost weight, gave up smoking and drinking, and stopped eating junk food by changing his mindset to his addictions. As a result of daily juicing, Jason lost four stone and is now free of his skin conditions and hay fever. Jason became a trainer for Allen Carr (the now deceased author of The Easy Way to Stop Smoking) and set up a clinic in Birmingham, West Midlands.

With the launch of his first published book in 2001 as the self-styled Juice Master, Jason Vale has continued to promote the health benefits of consuming freshly extracted juices and smoothies in the media. Vale, through publishers HarperCollins, has sold approximately 500,000 copies of his books (and accompanying DVDs) in the United Kingdom.

His books Stop Drinking 4 Life Easily! and Kick the Drink...Easily! specifically address the benefits of sobriety and offer advice for alcoholics.

Vale worked with Moulinex from 2003 to 2005 promoting one of their juice extractors that they later named after him. In 2005, Vale instead began to endorse a juicer with Royal Philips Electronics.

Vale and his company Juice Master Ltd have branched out into running seminars, retreats, and juice bars. Vale opened his first juice detox retreat in Turkey in 2005  and organises health seminars across the United Kingdom and Ireland. In 2008, Vale opened his second Irish juice bar in John Roberts Square in Waterford.

Media appearances
Vale began his TV career as a manager on Channel 4's The Fit Farm and has since appeared on This Morning, GMTV and numerous times on Five's The Wright Stuff. Vale has appeared in Irish media on The Ray D'Arcy Show, The Gerry Ryan Show, Studio One and popular culture show Xposé. Vale's promotion as The Juice Master by Royal Philips Electronics has achieved media attention in Denmark, Norway, The Netherlands, Finland, Turkey, and Italy.

Vale worked with Katie Price whom he claims to have helped lose two stone in three months, after the birth of her second child, on Vale's Turbo Charge programme.

His trampoline workout video, The Juice Master's Rebounding Workout, was featured on an episode of Red Letter Media's popular internet show, Best of the Worst, in January 2023.

Bibliography

CD/DVDs

References

External links
 
 Information about Jason Vale (HarperCollins)
 Juice Master Juice Bar opens in John Roberts' Square, Waterford Today

1969 births
British motivational speakers
British motivational writers
People from Kensington
Life coaches
Living people
British nutritionists
Alternative detoxification promoters
Diet food advocates
Writers from London